Marko Peruničić (born 1979 in Belgrade, Serbia) is a successful Serbian composer/arranger/producer who has collaborated with over 100 best selling Balkan artists during last 20 years. He is involved in music since his age of 11, initially as the founder, arranger and vocalist of Belgrade's youngest hip hop group ever, Belgrade Posse. Together with Darko Asik, he managed Index Radio show "Do the right thing" and organized and DJ-ed a number of hip hop events in Belgrade from 1994–1997. As the 16-year-old boy he collaborated with artists like 187 and Gru as arranger and vocalist. On his 19th birthday (14. September), with Nebojsa Arezina, Marko co-founded Atelje Trag, a music production company. Together, they've composed, arranged and produced over 700 songs for leading Serbian artists along with number of Radio and TV commercials and jingles. Atelje Trag also produced some of the biggest concerts and Ceremony shows for clients such as Jelena Karleusa, Natasa Bekvalac and Lepa Brena. Their ambitious and dynamic musical approach led them to the top of Serbian commercial music scene in early 00's. In the spring of 2007, Atelje Trag opened the doors of their SSL based state of the art ATG recording studio. Marko Peruničić lives and works in Belgrade, Serbia.

External links 
 Atelje Trag Group
 Class Act Entertainment

Serbian audio engineers
Serbian record producers
Serbian songwriters
Living people
1979 births